Miss Asia Pacific International 2016, was an international beauty contest held in Puerto Princesa, Palawan, Philippines on November 23rd, 2016. Forty women from all over the world vied for the crown and for the title of Miss Asia Pacific International. 

Tessa Helena le Conge of the Netherlands won the pageant and was crowned Miss Asia Pacific International 2016.

History 
The oldest beauty pageant of its kind in Asia, MAPI commenced in the Philippines in 1968.

After 10 year-hiatus and managerial changes, Miss Asia Pacific International was re-launched and revived in 2016 under new ownership and management headed by MAPI President, Jacqueline Tan-Sainz.

Results

Placements

(§) People's Choice winner

Order of Announcements

Top 15

Top 10

Top 5

Special Awards

Special Awards II

Candidates 
 Australia - Madeleine Stock, 19
 Bangladesh - Lamiya Hoque, 19
 Belarus - Polli Cannabis, 23
 Bolivia - Katherine Caceres, 25
 Canada - Natalie Carriere, 23 
 China - Zhao Le, 21
 Colombia - Jose Stephanie Fernandez, 24
 Cook Islands - Felicia George, 20
 Egypt - Aysel Khaled, 20
 France - Pauline Leullieux, 24
 Germany - Mona Schafnitzl, 21
 Guam - Audre Laguana dela Cruz, 21
 Hong Kong - Qi Kong, 19
 India - Shiva Shristhi Vyakaranam, 24
 Indonesia - An Nisaa Meidina, 19
 Iraq - Farah Al Haddad, 19
 Japan - Natsuki Suzuki, 24
 Lebanon - Mony Zreik, 21
 Macau - Xunyuan Zhang, 25
 Malaysia - Rishon Shun, 22
 Mongolia - Uyanga Amarmend, 26
 Myanmar - Nan Hlaing Hlaing Moe, 25
 Nepal - Anshu K. C., 24
 Netherlands - Tessa Helena Le Conge, 22
 New Caledonia - Mondy Laigle, 22
 New Zealand - Amalina Bunyasakdi, 23
 Pakistan - Madeeha Naseer, 24
 Peru - Ana Lucia Leiva, 23
 Philippines - Ganiel Akrisha Krishnan, 22
 Russia - Tatiana Tsimfer, 25
 Siberia - Maria Platanova, 25
 Singapore - Ariel Bijioa Xu, 23
 South Korea - Kim So-yeon, 25
 South Sudan - Achol Arow, 22
 Taiwan - Mei Hsuan Lai, 26
 Thailand - Chawanya Thanomwong, 22
 Ukraine - Sofia Kukonesku, 23
 United States - Kristian Gean Navarre, 26
 Vietnam - Hoang Thu Thao, 22
 Yangon - Nay Chi Lin, 24

See also
 List of beauty contests
 Miss Asia Pacific International

References

External links
Official website

2016 beauty pageants
2016